In mathematics, the Bretherton equation is a nonlinear partial differential equation introduced by Francis Bretherton in 1964:

  

with  integer and  While  and  denote partial derivatives of the scalar field 

The original equation studied by Bretherton has quadratic nonlinearity,  Nayfeh treats the case  with two different methods: Whitham's averaged Lagrangian method and the method of multiple scales.

The Bretherton equation is a model equation for studying weakly-nonlinear wave dispersion. It has been used to study the interaction of harmonics by nonlinear resonance. Bretherton obtained analytic solutions in terms of Jacobi elliptic functions.

Variational formulations
The Bretherton equation derives from the Lagrangian density:

through the Euler–Lagrange equation:

The equation can also be formulated as a Hamiltonian system: 

in terms of functional derivatives involving the Hamiltonian 

  and  

with  the Hamiltonian density – consequently  The Hamiltonian  is the total energy of the system, and is conserved over time.

Notes

References

 
 

 

Nonlinear partial differential equations
Exactly solvable models